The 2017 Little League World Series was held from August 17 to 27. Eight teams from the United States and eight teams from around the world competed in the 71st edition of the tournament. Tokyo Kitasuna Little League of Tokyo, Japan, defeated Lufkin Little League of Lufkin, Texas, in the championship game by a 12–2 score. It was the 11th time that a team from Japan won the tournament. Tokyo Kitasuna became the first league to win the tournament four times.

Teams

Regional qualifying tournaments were held between June and August 2017.

Results

The draw to determine the opening round pairings took place on June 15, 2017.

United States bracket

International bracket

Consolation games
Teams that lose their first two games get to play a crossover game against a team from the other side of the bracket that also lost its first two games. These games are labeled Game A and Game B.

Third place game
This consolation game is played between the loser of the United States championship and the loser of the International championship.

World Championship

Champions path
The Kitasuna LL reached the LLWS with a record of nine wins and only one loss. In total, their record was 14–1.

MLB Little League Classic
On March 9, 2017, Major League Baseball (MLB) and Lycoming County officials announced that Williamsport would host a regular season MLB game during the LLWS, branded as the MLB Little League Classic. The game took place on August 20, 2017, at BB&T Ballpark at Historic Bowman Field and was attended by the Little Leaguers and their families, along with select Lycoming County residents. The game featured the St. Louis Cardinals and the Pittsburgh Pirates, and was televised on ESPN (as part of Sunday Night Baseball), ESPN Deportes, and MLB Network. The Pirates won, 6–3.

References

 
2017
2017 in baseball
2017 in sports in Pennsylvania
August 2017 sports events in the United States
2017 in sports in Texas
2017 in Japanese sport